Dosar, also known as Dhusar, is a Vaishya community in North India that originated in the Dhosi hill region near Rewari in the Indian state of Haryana. The Dosar Vaishya community has a royal background in ancient times. In ancient times, people from dosar vaishya community were zamindars, kings or traders of weapons & ayurvedic medicines.

Basically, it is a minority caste because very less number of people belongs to this caste comparatively. Some court cases are pending which states that roots of this caste are not connected with vaishya (baniya) samaj and demands separate caste group for them. However, after having several proofs also, no justified decision came from courts into this till now.

Dhusar is a community of historical significance. They are mentioned in a Khandela (Sikar dist.) inscription of 807 AD

They are also mentioned in the Sakarari (Sikar district) inscription of VS 699 (AD 642-2) along with the Dharkata community.
The last Hindu ruler of Delhi Hem Chandra (often called Hemu) also belonged to the same community. The saint poet Sahajo Bai  and the publisher Munshi Nawal Kishore also belonged to the same community.

After independence many of them have established industries and setup businesses. Also many of them are in Indian military, police services and government administration.

The author of the famous Jhanda Geet (विजयी विश्व तिरंगा प्यारा, झण्डा ऊँचा रहे हमारा), Shyam Lal Gupta was a Dosar.

References

Bania communities
Social groups of Delhi
Social groups of Uttar Pradesh

Dosar Vaish Mahasamiti Organizes Holi Milan Program